Red Hot Music is a 1937 animated short produced by Terrytoons, starring Kiko the Kangaroo. It is the fifth cartoon in the character's series. In the Castle Films reissue, the cartoon was retitled Red Hot Rhythm!

Plot
The film starts in a radio station building which is, for some reason, named after Kiko. Inside, an orchestra is performing upbeat jazz music. Their melody is well received by everybody just outside. As the musicians work hard on their performance, fires mysteriously break out in the building.

At a nearby fire department, the alarm rings. The lead fireman, who is none other than Kiko the Kangaroo, leaps out of bed, and slides down the pole. He then heads his fellow firefighters toward the blazing building.

Kiko and the firemen arrive at the radio station on time, and begin to spray their water cannons at it. While he struggles to enter the building, Kiko retrieves the victims collected by his colleagues. When he finally gets inside, he finds the rooms flooded as a result of being heavily showered by the cannons. Kiko then finds a plug which he pulls, thus draining out all the water. After being carried out into the street by the current, Kiko celebrates his accomplished mission by conducting some music while his fellow firemen become his orchestra.

References

External links
 Red Hot Music at the Big Cartoon Database

1937 short films
1937 comedy films
1937 animated films
1930s English-language films
American animated short films
American black-and-white films
American comedy short films
Terrytoons shorts
Animated films about kangaroos and wallabies
Animated films about elephants
Films about firefighting
Animated films set in New York City
Films directed by George Gordon
Films directed by Mannie Davis
20th Century Fox short films